The Corner is the fourth compilation album released by the Oakland, California-based, underground hip hop collective, Hieroglyphics.  The album was released on September 20, 2005 by the group's own independent record label, Hieroglyphics Imperium Recordings.

Track listing 
 "What The Funk" (Producer Q. Tones) (Artist J. Owens, O. Lindsey, T. Massey, A. Carter) – 03:17
 "Say That Then" (Producer J. Zone) (Artist J. Owens) – 03:28
 "Talk Dirty" (Producer A. Carter) (Artist O. Lindsey) (featuring P. Peacock) – 03:41
 "Phenomenon" (Producer Mike Loe) (Artist O. Credle) – 04:00
 "Raindance" (Producer Elon.js) (Artist T. Massey) – 03:01
 "Good Time Charlie" (ProducerCompound7), (Artist A. Carter) – 04:15
 "I'm Gonna Make It" (T. Jones) – 04:54
 "Stop Lock" (Producer Anoimous for Tree Monkey Productions) (Artist P. Peacock) – 4:08
 "Stars" (O. Lindsey) – 03:26
 "Everybodys Gangsta"(Shake Da Mayor) – 03:29
 "Love Flowin (Live)" (Produced O. Lindsey) (Artist J. Owens, O. Lindsey, P. Peacock, A. Carter) – 2:57

External links 
 The Corner at Audio Lunch Box
 The Corner at Hieroglyphics.com

2005 compilation albums
Hieroglyphics (group) albums
Hieroglyphics Imperium Recordings compilation albums